The 2020 International GT Open is the fifteenth season of the International GT Open, the grand tourer-style sports car racing series founded in 2006 by the Spanish GT Sport Organización. It began on 8 August at the Hungaroring and ended at the Circuit de Barcelona-Catalunya on 1 November after six rounds.

Entry list

Race calendar and results
 A seven-round provisional calendar was revealed on 22 October 2019. The schedule will feature six circuits from the 2019 calendar, with Silverstone dropped in favor of the Hungaroring. The schedule also switches the order of some rounds with the Spa round now occurring before the Hockenheimring and the season finale occurring at Catalunya rather than Monza. On 19 March 2020, it was announced that the season opening round at Le Castellet would be moved to 20-23 August in response to the coronavirus outbreak. On 6 April, 2020, it was announced that the Spa round would be postponed to a later date as well. The Barcelona round was also moved in response to avoid having races on consecutive weekends. A provisional calendar was released on 19 May 2020 and involved dropping to a six round season instead of the planned seven due to the cancellation of the Hockenheim round because of track conflicts. The only change made afterwards to this calendar was to move the Hungaroring round to a new date.

Championship standings

Points systems 

Points are awarded to the top 10 (Pro) or top 6 (Am, Pro-Am, Teams) classified finishers. If less than 6 participants start the race or if less than 75% of the original race distance is completed, half points are awarded. At the end of the season, the lowest race score is dropped; however, the dropped race cannot be the result of a disqualification or race ban.

Overall

Pro-Am, Am, and Teams

Drivers' championships

Overall

Pro-Am

Am

Teams' championship 
Only the highest two finishing cars from a team count towards the Teams' Championship

Notes

References

External links
 

International GT Open
International GT Open seasons